Michael Vernon "Mike" Baldwin is a fictional character from the British ITV soap opera Coronation Street, portrayed by Johnny Briggs. He first appeared on 11 October 1976 and became one of the show's central characters until his final appearance on 7 April 2006.

Before his debut on the series, Mike started off his career as a market stall holder until a few years later the character had evolved into a legitimate businessman who was running his own factory. Mike soon opened his namesake denim-maker business, Baldwin's Casuals, in Weatherfield and moved there after ending his relationship with his common-law wife Anne Woodley. Quickly establishing himself as the street's most uncompromising employer, Mike was quick to threaten his machinists with the sack if they slacked and had additionally taking a dim view of workers getting above themselves.

Since his first appearance, Mike was involved in several of the show's highly profiled events. This included a love triangle scenario which saw Mike having an affair with local resident Deirdre Hunt (Anne Kirkbride) while she was still married to her husband Ken Barlow (William Roache). The storyline continued onto 1983 and became a ratings winner, with the UK's newspapers giving the story much coverage. The episode where Deirdre ends her affair with Mike and reconciles with Ken was the show's highest-rated episode at the time; as such, the news was so big that it ended up being announced on the scoreboard during a Manchester United v Arsenal match at Old Trafford - with the words "Ken and Deirdre reunited. Ken 1 – Mike 0" resulting in cheers from the spectators.

The follow up of his affair with Deirdre triggered a longstanding feud between Mike and Ken, with the rivalry between them dominating the show's impact for the next two decades. This continued as Mike would later go on to marry Ken's daughter Susan (Wendy Jane Walker), which ultimately led to the two arch-enemies going on a custody battle for Mike and Susan's son Adam (Iain De Caestecker) following her death in 2001. At times, however, Ken and Mike were often forced to work together in events which saw Deirdre being wrongfully imprisoned by her fraudulent new love interest Jon Lindsay (Owen Aaronovitch) in 1998 and then the two rivals later becoming hostages in an armed robbery at Fresco's Supermarket in 2000.

In his other major storylines, Mike issued a short-lived marriage of convenience with his second spouse Jackie Ingram (Shirin Taylor); established a much-more prolonging marriage with his third spouse Alma Sedgewick (Amanda Barrie) that progressively lasted until the pair's divorce and Alma's eventual death of cervical cancer; instigated a competitive conflict with fellow nemesis Don Brennan (Geoffrey Hinsliff) that culminated with the latter kidnapping Alma and then plotting to kill Mike on many unsuccessful attempts; divorced his fourth spouse Linda Sykes (Jacqueline Pirie) after their ill-fated marriage collapsed as a result Linda's gold-digging agenda that gradually emerged ever since she cheated on Mike with his long-lost son Mark Redman (Paul Fox); and formed a close companionship with his supposed nephew Danny (Bradley Walsh) and his family after it had slowly transpired that Danny was actually Mike's son.

The character's exit saw Mike being diagnosed with Alzheimer's disease, which commenced in late 2005 and continued on in 2006 until Mike was eventually killed off in the story's climax; Mike, in his last moments, collapsed and then died in the arms of Ken. A couple of years later, Mike would posthumously reappear in a 2012 short special episode shown as part of Text Santa - with the character appearing as a ghost sent from Hell to give Ken's next-door neighbour, Norris Cole (Malcolm Hebden), a warning to change his ways.

Storylines
Mike Baldwin began the majority of his life with a relationship with florist Maggie Dunlop. Problems for the pair soon emerged when Maggie became pregnant and she eventually ended things with him after Mike refused to buy the florist's she worked in. She married Harry Redman shortly before the birth of her son, Mark. The Redmans moved away, and Mike did not see Mark for years.

One major storyline involving Mike came in 1983 when he had an affair with Deirdre Barlow (Anne Kirkbride). Before her marriage to Ken Barlow (William Roache), Deirdre had dated Mike, but decided Ken suited her better. When their marriage became jaded, she turned to Mike. After she had confessed everything to Ken, Mike turned up on the doorstep in the hope of taking her away, but she decided to stay with Ken. This event began the long-running feud between Mike and Ken. Mike went on to marry Ken's daughter, Susan Barlow (Wendy Jane Walker), who was many years his junior. This upset Ken further. The marriage failed because Mike and Susan disagreed about their plans for the future. On discovering that Susan was pregnant, Mike wanted her to become a stay-at-home wife and mother but Susan decided to have an abortion, and moved to Newcastle after just a year of marriage.

Mike's on/off relationship with Alma Sedgewick (Amanda Barrie) lasted the longest. It seemed to be over when he abandoned Alma to marry wealthy widow Jackie Ingram (Shirin Taylor), who inherited a factory from her late husband, Peter (who had died of a heart attack during an argument with Mike). Jackie soon saw through him and their marriage lasted one week. Jackie threatened Mike with a shotgun if he did not get out of her sight. A couple of years later, after Alma's relationship with Ken failed because of her feelings for Mike, Mike and Alma finally married. Mike once again had his own business, the underwear factory Underworld. In 1999, Mike was seduced by Julia Stone, who blackmailed him for large sums of cash. When Alma discovered this, she left Mike; once they had divorced, she reverted to her maiden name of Halliwell. Unable to win Alma back, Mike settled with loud-mouthed machinist Linda Sykes (Jacqueline Pirie), who was interested only in his money. His long-lost son, Mark Redman (Paul Fox), came to Weatherfield, and Mike took him on at the factory as manager. However, on his wedding night, Mike found out that Mark and Linda had been having an affair. At first, he blamed Mark but he soon enraged Linda by choosing to spend time with Alma, who was dying of cervical cancer. At this point, he realised that marrying Linda was a mistake. Following Alma's death, he ended the marriage and Linda slept with Mike's new business associate in revenge. She also caused a stir at Fred Elliott's (John Savident) wedding to her mother, Eve Sykes (Melanie Kilburn), and the pressure built on Mike as Mark returned for the celebration. Mike was seen arguing with Linda, who mysteriously disappeared. Mike was arrested on suspicion of murder but Linda was found in Ireland with a new man.

From the early 2000s, Mike was seen less frequently as actor Johnny Briggs negotiated a reduced working schedule to allow him to enjoy more leisure time, which he often spent at his home in Florida. Weeks would often pass where Mike was not seen at all, though he did still participate in substantial storylines when his character was present during his remaining years in the programme.

In 2001, Ken revealed that Susan had a son, Adam Barlow (Iain De Caestecker/Sam Robertson), fathered by Mike. Susan had been lying when she said she had terminated her pregnancy. As Mike began a fight for access to his son, Susan attempted to escape again but in her haste, she crashed her car on the motorway and was killed. Adam survived the crash and this led to a custody battle between Mike and Ken. Mike was awarded custody, but returned Adam to his boarding school in Scotland, where his friends were.

In 2004, Mike's son Danny (Bradley Walsh), Danny's wife, Frankie (Debra Stephenson), and their sons, Jamie (Rupert Hill) and Warren (Danny Young), came to live in Weatherfield, where Danny helped Mike run the factory.  Many long-time viewers did not like the addition of Danny and Frankie to the cast, as their existence had only been made possible by continuity error; Mike had long been portrayed as an only child and, adding confusion, Mike's father was also named Frankie. In late October 2005, it is discovered that Danny is actually Mike's son, a result of a fling between Mike and his sister-in-law, Viv (Patricia Brake).

Towards the end of 2005, Mike was diagnosed with Alzheimer's disease, aged 63. He soon split from his beautiful girlfriend Penny King (Pauline Fleming), whom he had intended to marry. He once asked Rita Fairclough (Barbara Knox) how her husband Len (Peter Adamson) was - when he had in fact died more than 20 years ago. He also went into The Rovers Return and asked where Bet Lynch (Julie Goodyear) was, not remembering that she had left the pub 10 years earlier. A further misunderstanding caused him to become estranged from Adam. Danny engineered sole inheritance of Mike's empire, egged on by his girlfriend Leanne Battersby (Jane Danson).

Mike's last appearance was in the episode of 7 April 2006. He had been admitted to hospital with pneumonia, but escaped when Jamie left his side for a moment. Making it back to his factory on Coronation Street, he was found by his old rival Ken. Shortly afterwards, he collapsed and died in Ken's arms, after having a massive heart attack. He was 64 years old. His passing – like that of Alma in 2001 – was respected with the theme tune not being played over the credits, though a continuity announcement was made. His last words were "You're finished Barlow, Deirdre loves me, she's mine." Over the last few months of his life, he had been confusing the past and present: Alma, his beloved former wife who had died in 2001, was often mentioned, as was Bet – he even broke into Bet's former home in 2006, to be confronted by the current resident, Les Battersby (Bruce Jones).

In October 2019, Adam discusses Mike's death with Ken and reveals the irony of Mike dying in Ken's arms.

Creation

Backstory
Making his first appearance in 1976 as a Cockney businessman with an eye for the ladies, Mike was the son of an occasional character, Frank "Frankie" Baldwin, a former docker and Cockney wide boy. He is said to have been introduced following pressure from Thames Television and Southern Television to introduce a character from the South of England, as the series' ratings fell in the mid-1970s especially in those regions. Mike Baldwin became chiefly known for his ruthlessness in business and his string of ruined relationships. During his time on the show, Mike had 25 girlfriends and four wives.

Mike's family history was retconned in 2004 when mention was made of his brother Harry. Prior to this, Mike was always referred to as an only child.

Development

Relationship with Alma Halliwell
Mike and Alma Sedgewick's (Amanda Barrie) romance stemmed back to 1989 and they wed on-screen in 1992, the marriage lasting seven years. It has been suggested in a 2006 ITV documentary that Mike, an antagonistic womanising character, met his match in Alma. William Roache, who plays Ken Barlow, has stated that of all Mike's many women in the serial, he always felt that Alma was Mike's true love, the one that was right and good for him. Briggs has stated that he always enjoyed watching the scenes between Mike and Alma, because Alma knew how to handle Mike. Barrie has discussed the way she approached playing the romance between Mike and Alma, suggesting that as Alma she treated Mike in the same way that she [Barrie] treated Briggs off-set, poking fun at him.

Feud with Ken Barlow
It was suggested in an ITV documentary in 2006 that Ken and Mike's hatred was a clash of cultures: "Barlow the lefty do-gooder versus Baldwin, the cut-and-thrust money grabber." Briggs has claimed that Ken was jealous of Mike because he was rich and successful while Ken was not, and Roache has claimed that the reason Ken disliked Mike was because he was a self-centred and self-made individual.

Ken's feud with Mike—spanning over 20 years—began in 1983, when Ken discovered that his wife, Deirdre, was having an affair with Mike. Of the love triangle storyline, Briggs has said, "the way it captured the nation was amazing. Everyone was talking about it and the pubs were empty. Men were shouting out: 'Go on Mike, give her one.' People were disappointed when she went back to Ken". The storyline had significant cultural impact, with the press claiming that the country was divided between those who thought Deirdre should remain with Ken, and those who thought she should leave with Mike. In her 2003 book, Hobson suggested that Ken "spent at least nineteen years unable to cope with the sense of rejection and betrayal" caused by Mike's and Deirdre's affair.

Scriptwriters capitalised on the rivalry between the characters when, in 1986, Mike married Ken's daughter Susan, a union that Ken strongly opposed. Numerous fights between Ken and Mike were featured, and Briggs has suggested that they became famous for their brawls. The first fight between the pair occurred in 1986, when Ken confronted Mike in his factory about Mike's maltreatment of his daughter. Of the confrontation, Briggs has said, "It was a classic – Baldwin getting it in his own territory, the factory. It took a lot to get Ken angry but after the way Mike had treated his daughter, he was furious. He marched into the office and let him have it. This was one of those rare times he caught Mike off-guard." Mike was shown to get revenge on Ken, though it took a further four years before he could do so on-screen. In a scene which aired in 1990, Mike punched Ken, knocking him over a table in the Rovers Return public house. Briggs has suggested that he and Roache became old hands at doing on-screen fistfights, and that both really enjoyed doing the stunts. According to Briggs, no choreographers were ever used. In 1998 one incident left Briggs with an injury after he fell backwards.

Mike and Ken were forced to work together in 2000, when they were featured in a storyline dubbed the "Freshco siege". Ken and Mike were among several series regulars held up at gunpoint in the soap's local supermarket, where Ken had been working as a trolley pusher. The episode was broadcast after the 9 pm watershed due to its depiction of violence. Ken and Mike were bound together by armed robbers, which facilitated an end to their feud; Ken helped Mike to combat a panic attack. The pair resolved to put the past behind them; it was a temporary reprieve. Mike had unknowingly fathered a son, Adam, during his brief marriage to Susan Barlow; she kept the baby a secret from him. Mike discovered Adam's existence in 2001; Susan attempted to flee, but was killed in a motor accident. Then followed a battle between Mike and Ken for custody of Adam, with Ken adamant that Mike should not look after his grandson. However both Ken and Mike made the peace again after promising Alma that they would be nice to each other before she dies.

The feud came to an end on-screen in 2006, when Briggs quit the role of Mike. Mike was killed-off, dying of Alzheimer's disease; he died in Ken's arms. In the final scenes, a disoriented and dying Mike was found wandering the streets by Ken, and as Ken cradled Mike in his arms, the rivals talked about old times before Mike died, signifying the end of their 20-year feud. To promote Mike's final scenes, Radio Times released a series of photographs with Ken and Mike re-enacting Arthur Devis's (1807) painting of the death of Horatio Nelson—Baldwin was shown surrounded by his nearest and dearest during his final moments, with Ken prominently positioned next to him, taking on the role of Captain Hardy, Nelson's trusted colleague to whom Nelson famously uttered "Kiss me" before he died. Producer Maire Tracey said, "The fact that Mike dies in Ken's arms says it all. For most of Mike's life, it was his battles with Ken that kept him going. Like two cowboys, they spent their lives sizing each other up. Behind the scenes Bill Roache has even suggested to Johnny Briggs that they should make a version of Brokeback Mountain for the two elderly cowboys. Both Ken and Mike will miss the bust-ups."

Reception
Journalist Johann Hari, writing for The Independent heaped praise upon Mike's dementia storyline: "You can see some of these qualities in the storyline that has just stuttered to a close, the tale of the cracking and breaking of wide-boy Street stalwart Mike Baldwin into dementia and death. A soap can do Alzheimer's perfectly because it can draw on the collected memories of it audience in a way no other art form, except perhaps the epic novel, can. When Mike loses it and starts crying for Alma – the ex-wife who died years ago – we remember her too. When we see him breaking from his dementia-fever for a moment and asking his old flame Deirdre to dance – an almost unimaginably sad scene, as he beams in mid-dance and says: 'This is lovely', while she quietly weeps over his shoulder – the performances are layered with literally decades of shared experience."

Grace Dent, writing for The Guardian heaped similar praise on the storyline as she paid tribute to the legendary character: "So, farewell Mike Baldwin. Laid on the cobbles in front of the Kabin, this week Mike took his last breaths, clutched to the breast of his nemesis Ken Barlow, witnessed by Rita and Emily, both neighbours of 30 years. A peculiarly fitting end to the cockney king of knickers. He'll be sadly missed. No more Mike Baldwin in his Edinburgh Woollen Mill golfing jerseys and smart-casual slacks sneaking a fine single malt and a lamb hotpot. No more clashes with Fizz over shoddy stitching or scanning the obituaries for wealthy widows to woo. No more boozy afternoons at the 19th hole. Literally the end of an era. Although Mike's decline from Alzheimer's was bleak and harrowing, there were bittersweet moments to his final days. Imaginary meetings with Bet Lynch, Alma Halliwell and his mother. Chess with Chesney and a day out in town with old flame Deirdre. The time, at last, to watch Ready Steady Cook and wear pyjamas until tea-time."

References

External links

Coronation Street characters
Fictional characters with dementia
Fictional businesspeople
Fictional people from London
Television characters introduced in 1976
Male characters in television
Male villains